Curtis Realious McClinton Sr. (March 22, 1913 - June 27, 2012) was a civil rights activist and state legislator in Kansas. He served in the Kansas Senate. His son, Curtis McClinton Jr., was a star football player at the University of Kansas and in the NFL.

He was born in Braggs, Oklahoma. He served in the Kansas Senate from 1960 to 1968.
In 2002 he was interviewed on The HistoryMakers.

References

1913 births
2012 deaths
People from Braggs, Oklahoma
Kansas state senators
20th-century American politicians